Out of the Darkness is a 1915 American drama silent film directed by George Melford and written by Hector Turnbull. The film stars Charlotte Walker, Thomas Meighan, Marjorie Daw, Hal Clements, Tom Forman and Loyola O'Connor. The film was released on September 9, 1915, by Paramount Pictures.

Plot
The owner of a large cannery (Charlotte Walker) employs many women and children in horrible working conditions. She refuses to see the manager (Thomas Meighan) who wants to try to get better conditions for the employees. She hits her head and ends up forgetting who she is. She ends up working at the cannery with the manager (who doesn't recognize her). The workers finally revolt and tie up the manager in a burning factory and the owner, who fell in love with him, suddenly remembers everything because of the shock of the situation. After rescuing him, she tries to make everything right again.

Cast 
Charlotte Walker as Helen Scott
Thomas Meighan as	Harvey Brooks
Marjorie Daw as Jennie Sands
Hal Clements as John Scott
Tom Forman as Tom Jameson
Loyola O'Connor as Mrs. Sands

Preservation status
The film is preserved at EYE Institut (aka Filmmuseum Amsterdam).

References

External links 

 
 Out of the Darkness at silentera.com
 

1915 films
1910s English-language films
Silent American drama films
1915 drama films
Paramount Pictures films
Films directed by George Melford
American black-and-white films
American silent feature films
1910s American films